Yad HaShmona (lit. Memorial of the Eight) is a small moshav shitufi in central Israel. Located in the Judean Mountains near Jerusalem, it falls under the jurisdiction of Mateh Yehuda Regional Council.

History

Yad HaShmona was founded in 1971 by a small group of Finnish Christians and was named for eight Jewish refugees from Austria who escaped to Finland in 1938. The Finnish government, collaborating with the Nazis, handed the refugees over to the Gestapo in 1942. Seven of them were murdered in Auschwitz; the only survivor, Dr. Kolman, who lost his family in extermination camps, later immigrated to Israel.

Activities 
Yad HaShmona is a community and centre for Messianic Jews in Israel, with around 260 residents. The area is home to the Yad Hashmona Country Hotel and Restaurant and the Home of the Bible Translators.

Biblical garden 
In 2000, a biblical garden was built at Yad Hashmona in cooperation with the Swiss Beit Shalom Association and the Israel Antiquities Authority (IAA).

The garden gives visitors a glimpse into the spiritual, physical and agricultural world of the Jewish people in Biblical times. It displays a variety of biblical plants and trees as well as reconstructed farms from biblical times. The garden includes an ancient wine press, an olive oil press, a 'mikveh' (ritual bath), a burial cave, an agricultural watchtower, a Galilean-style synagogue and a Bedouin tent.

Economy 
The community runs a guesthouse (Yad Hashmona Country Hotel), convention center and banquet hall. In 2000, a biblical village was inaugurated with the assistance of the Swiss Beth Shalom society and the Israel Antiquities Authority. A Biblical garden planted on the hillside replicates agriculture in ancient times. Apart from tourism, the economy is based on carpentry.

Jad-Hashmonan ystävät r.y (Friends of Yad HaShmona) supports Yad HaShmona with prayers from Finland and helps the village financially to implement mutually agreed projects.

Litigation
In 2008, a lesbian couple married in the UK wanted to hold  a wedding party for their friends and family at the banquet hall in Yad HaShmona. After Yad HaShmona learned the couple was not a straight couple, the venue cancelled the reservation, calling homosexuality "an abomination", among other things. The couple filed a lawsuit on grounds of discrimination based on sexual orientation. The lower court judge ruled in favour of the couple based on a year 2000 law forbidding discrimination in public places. In June 2014, the appeal by Yad HaShmona was denied by the Jerusalem District Court, which upheld the lower court's ruling on the case with a compensation 80,000 ₪ (around €20,000).

Demography 
According to 2014 data, the vast majority of the population in Yad ha-Shmona was Jewish (including the statistical category "other", which includes non-Arab residents of Jewish origin but without formal affiliation to the Jewish religion).

It is a small village-type community with a long-standing stagnant population. As of 31 December 2014, 114 people lived here. During 2014, the population decreased by 1.7%.

See also
Finland-Israel relations

References

External links
Official website

Christianity in Israel
Moshavim
Agricultural Union
Populated places established in 1971
Populated places in Jerusalem District
1971 establishments in Israel
Finnish diaspora